The Buckeye League was a Class D level minor league baseball league that played briefly in the 1915 season. The six–team Buckeye League consisted of franchises based  exclusively in Ohio. The Buckeye League played just a portion 1915 season before permanently folding.

History
The Buckeye League began play in the 1915 season, formed as a Class D level league, with Al Lawson serving as league president.
The 1915 Buckeye League was a six–team league that began play on May 19, 1915. The league was formed with teams representing Akron Ohio (Akron Rubbermen), Canton, Ohio, (Canton Giants), Findlay, Ohio (Findlay Finns), Lima, Ohio (Lima Boosters), Marion, Ohio (Marion Senators) and Newark, Ohio (Newark New Socks). During the season, both the Marion and Canton franchises disbanded on June 11, 1915. The Buckeye League, with four remaining teams, permanently disbanded on July 5, 1915.

The Lima Boosters, with an average roster age of 34.8 were in 1st place when the Buckeye League folded on July 5, 1915. Lima finished with a record of 25–18, playing under manager Sandy Murray. Lima was followed by the Findlay Finns (22–19), Akron Rubbermen (22–21) and Newark New Socks (14–24) in the final standings. The Marion Senators had a record of 10–5 and the Canton Giants were 5–11 when they both folded on June 11, 1915.

The Buckeye League never played again as a minor league after folding in 1915.

Buckeye League teams

Standings & statistics

1915 Buckeye League 
 Marion and Canton disbanded June 11Playoffs: None Scheduled. The league disbanded July 5.

References

Defunct minor baseball leagues in the United States
Baseball leagues in Ohio
Defunct professional sports leagues in the United States
Sports leagues established in 1915
Sports leagues disestablished in 1915